Denis Istomin and Evgeny Kirillov were the defending champions, but only Kirillov started in this tournament. He teamed up with Sergei Bubka, however they lost to Andis Juška and Deniss Pavlovs in the quarterfinal.
Michail Elgin and Alexandre Kudryavtsev defeated Alexey Kedryuk and Denis Matsukevich 4–6, 6–3, [10–6] in the final.

Seeds

Draw

Draw

References
 Doubles Draw
 Qualifying Draw

Penza Cup - Doubles
Penza Cup
2009 in Russian tennis